Thomas or Tom Lane may refer to:
Thomas H. Lane, American organic chemist
Thomas J. Lane (1898–1994), U.S. Representative from Massachusetts
Thomas Lane (14th-century MP) (died 1423), MP for Canterbury
Thomas Lane (17th-century MP) (1582–1652), MP for Wycombe 1628, 1640–1648
Thomas Lane (VC) (1836–1889), Irish recipient of the Victoria Cross
Thomas Lane, California, an unincorporated community
Thomas "T.J." Lane, perpetrator of the Chardon High School shooting
Thomas K. Lane, Saint Paul native former Minneapolis Police Department officer, fired and convicted on state and federal charges for his part in the murder of George Floyd
Tom Lane (computer scientist) (born 1955), American computer scientist involved in image compression standards and PostgreSQL development
Tommy Lane, American wrestler

Lane, Thomas